The Charles Patterson House, at 506 S. Union St. in Natchez, Mississippi, also known as Camelia Gardens, is a historic Queen Anne-style house that was designed by Robert E. Bost and was built by Bost in 1898.  It was listed on the National Register of Historic Places in 1994.

It was included as a contributing building in the large Downriver Residential Historic District, NRHP-listed in 1999.

References

Houses on the National Register of Historic Places in Mississippi
Queen Anne architecture in Mississippi
Houses completed in 1898
Houses in Natchez, Mississippi
National Register of Historic Places in Natchez, Mississippi
Individually listed contributing properties to historic districts on the National Register in Mississippi